Jenna Carroll (born 8 May 1990) is an English female football defender. She currently plays for Fylde.

Early life 
Carroll was born in Preston.

Club career
Carroll spent over six years with Blackburn's centre of excellence before making her National Division debut in December 2006.

In October 2008, Carroll was one of four Rovers players to be sent off, the others being Katie Anderton, Natalie Brewer and Natalie Preston, as they drew 4–4 in the Women's Premier League Cup against Portsmouth Ladies.

Jenna Transferred to PNE in 2010 and is currently a first team regular with North End.

Statistics

References

1990 births
Living people
Footballers from Preston, Lancashire
English women's footballers
Blackburn Rovers L.F.C. players
FA Women's National League players
Women's association football defenders
Fylde Ladies F.C. players